Love & War is the debut album by Jerzee Monét. It was released on July 16, 2002 through DreamWorks Records. The album debuted at number sixty on the US  Billboard 200 and number fourth-teen on the Top R&B/Hip-Hop Albums chart in 2002.
The album was produced by Tyric Jones, also DMX, Eve and Ja Rule made appearances as well.

Background
On July 16, 2002, Jerzee Monét debut album Love & War was released. The album debuted at number 60 on the US Billboard 200, number 14 on the Top R&B/Hip-Hop Albums chart and number 60 on Top Albums Sales. It stayed on the Billboard 200 chart for five weeks and on the Hip-Hop/R&B album chart for nine consecutive weeks.

Singles
The album lead single "Most High" peaked at 54 on Top R&B/Hip-Hop songs, 25 on Adult R&B and 54 on R&B/Hip-Hop Airplay chart.

The second single from the album, "Work It Out" didn't get to make it on the charts.

Track listing

Samples
"Most High"
"Kissing My Love" by Bill Withers
"Respect"
"You're Getting A Little Too Smart" by Detroit Emeralds
"Better Than That"
"All 4 The Ca$h" by Gang Starr

Credits and personnel
Credits adapted from the liner notes of Love & War and AllMusic:

Management
DreamWorks Records
SKG Music L. L. C.

Recording locations

N Key Studios, (Dayton, OH)
Streetlight Studios (New York City)

Credits

Jerzee Monét – primary artist
Eve – featured artist, primary artist
Brian Garder – mastering
Ja Rule – featured artist, guest artist, performer, primary Artist
Tyric Jones – engineer, mixing, mixing engineer, multi instruments, producer, programming
Makeda Davis – composer
George Karras – engineer
Allison Martinello – a&r
John McClain – executive producer
Dave Pensado – mixing
Nakia Shine – producer
Tom Soares – engineer, mixing, mixing engineer
Andrew Stephens – programming
Robert White – a&r
DMX – featured artist, guest artist
Kwaku Alston – photography

Charts

References

2002 debut albums
DreamWorks Records albums